Beautiful Things: A Memoir is a 2021 memoir by American lawyer Hunter Biden, who is the second son of U.S. President Joe Biden and his first wife, Neilia Hunter Biden. It was published on April 6, 2021 by Gallery Books, an imprint of Simon & Schuster. In The New York Times reviewer Elisabeth Egan described the book as "equal parts family saga, grief narrative and addict's howl".

Synopsis 
In Beautiful Things, Hunter Biden writes about his family and recounts his history of substance abuse and path to sobriety. He discusses the grief and trauma he experienced following the death of his brother Beau Biden and the 1972 car accident in which he was injured and that killed his mother, Neilia, and his sister, Naomi. He also defends his time on the board of the Ukraine company Burisma.

Hunter Biden told CBS that his cocaine addiction reached a zenith in 2015 after the death of his brother Beau.

Publication and promotion 
Beautiful Things was published in hardcover and e-book format on April 6, 2021 by Gallery Books, an imprint of Simon & Schuster. An audiobook, narrated by Biden, was released the same day.

Biden promoted the book with a series of media appearances, including a CBS Sunday Morning interview by Tracy Smith and a CBS This Morning interview by Anthony Mason. Biden also appeared on Jimmy Kimmel Live! and WTF with Marc Maron.

The book debuted at number four on The New York Times nonfiction best-seller list for the week ending April 10, 2021. It also ranked number 130 on the Amazon Best Sellers, but sold just 10,000 copies in the first week.

Reception 
Marianne Szegedy-Maszak of The Washington Post called it "at once harrowing, relentless and a determined exercise in trying to seize his own narrative from the clutches of the Republicans and the press." Seija Rankin of Entertainment Weekly praised Biden's "raw" depiction of addiction; Rankin, however, believed the book's narrative felt rushed and included unnecessary details that felt scripted.

References 

2021 non-fiction books
American memoirs
Literature about substance abuse
Debut books
Memoirs about drugs
Books about cocaine
Books about Joe Biden
Hunter Biden
Gallery Books books